T. Max Watson House is a historic home located at Forest City, Rutherford County, North Carolina.  It built in 1939, and is a two-story, five bay, central passage plan, Georgian Revival style white brick dwelling.  It has a side gable roof covered with interlocking red clay tiles.  The front facade features a central projecting bay, one-story portico supported by three Ionic order columns, and second floor Palladian window.

It was added to the National Register of Historic Places in 2001.  It is located in the East Main Street Historic District.

References

Forest City, North Carolina
Houses on the National Register of Historic Places in North Carolina
Georgian Revival architecture in North Carolina
Houses completed in 1939
Houses in Rutherford County, North Carolina
National Register of Historic Places in Rutherford County, North Carolina
Historic district contributing properties in North Carolina